Striginiana is a genus of moths in the family Eupterotidae from Africa.

Species
Striginiana agrippa (Weymer, 1909)
Striginiana camerunica (Aurivillius, 1893)
Striginiana nobilis (Holland, 1893)
Striginiana pseudostrigina (Rothschild, 1917)
Striginiana strigina (Westwood, 1849)

References

afromoths
Bouyer 2011. Démembrement et réorganisation des genres africains Jana Herrich-Schäffer, 1854 et Hoplojana Aurivillius, 1901 (Lepidoptera, Eupterotidae). - Lambillionea 111(3):211–218.

Janinae